Ego Trip is the eleventh studio album by American rock band Papa Roach. It was released on April 8, 2022, through New Noize. Five singles have been released from the album: "Swerve", "Kill the Noise", "Stand Up", "Cut the Line", and "No Apologies".

Promotion
On August 1, 2021, the band released a new single entitled "Swerve", featuring Jason Aalon Butler of Fever 333 and American rapper Sueco. On September 9, 2021, Papa Roach released the first radio single "Kill The Noise" from their upcoming eleventh studio album in 2022. On October 29, 2021, the band released a new song "Dying To Believe". On January 21, 2022, "Stand Up" followed as the album's fourth single. The fourth single "Cut the Line" was released on March 1, 2022. The album Ego Trip was announced on the same day and was released on April 8, 2022.  A fifth single "No Apologies" was released on June 14, 2022.  On January 6, 2023, the band released a new version of "Swerve", featuring Hollywood Undead. In the same month, on January 27, they released a new version of another song, "Cut The Line", featuring Beartooth frontman Caleb Shomo. They also announced a digital deluxe edition for Ego Trip, which released on March 17, 2023.

Critical reception

Ego Trip was met with generally positive reviews from critics. At the aggregating website Metacritic, the album has received a normalized rating of 68 out of 100, based on 4 critical reviews, indicating "generally favorable" reviews.

Commercial performance
Ego Trip debuted within the Top 40 in three different countries worldwide, including Germany, Scotland and Switzerland, charting the highest and peaking within the Top 10 at number 9 on the Swiss Hitparade chart. The album was considered a commercial disappointment in the United Kingdom, becoming the first album by the band to fail to chart on the UK Albums Chart, though it peaked on the UK Album Sales and UK Rock & Metal Albums Chart chart at number 18 and 3 respectively. In the United States, the album debuted at number 115 on the US Billboard 200 selling 6,900 copies in its first week, becoming the lowest charting album released by the band in their home country. As of September 2022, Ego Trip has collated a total of 62,000 album equivalent units in the US.

Track listing

Charts

References

2022 albums
Papa Roach albums